The Workhouse Test Act 1723 (9 George 1, c.7) also known as the General Act or Knatchbull's Act was poor relief legislation passed by the British government by Sir Edward Knatchbull in 1723.  The "workhouse test" was that a person who wanted to receive poor relief had to enter a workhouse and undertake a set amount of work. The test was intended to prevent irresponsible claims on a parish's poor rate.

Knatchbull's legislation For Amending the Laws relating to Settlement, Employment and Relief of the Poor marked the first emergence of the workhouse test although this principle was adopted more fully after the passing of the Poor Law Amendment Act.

Under the act parishes could provide relief as an individual parish, combine with other parishes or poor relief could be sub-contracted out to those that would feed, clothe and house the poor in return for a weekly rate from the parish.

Between 1723 and 1750, 600 parish workhouses were built in England and Wales as a direct result of Knatchull's Act. The costs of this indoor relief was high especially when workhouses were wasteful; this led to the passing of Gilbert's Act in 1782.

References

External links
The text of the Act

Poor Law in Britain and Ireland
Great Britain Acts of Parliament 1723